The Cinema of the Russian Empire (Pre-reform Russian orthography: Синематографъ Россійской Имперіи) roughly spans the period 1907 - 1920, during which time a strong infrastructure was created.  From the over 2,700 art films created in Russia before 1920, around 300 remain to this day.

The beginning of cinema in Russia

In April 1896, just four months after the first films were shown in Paris, the first cinematic apparatus appeared in Russia. The first films seen in the Russian Empire were via the Lumière brothers, in Moscow and St. Petersburg in May 1896.  In the same month, the first film was shot in Russia, by Lumière cameraman Camille Cerf, a record of the coronation of Nicholas II at the Kremlin in Moscow.   The first permanent cinema was opened in St Petersburg in 1896 at Nevsky Prospect, No. 46.

The first Russian movies were shown in the Moscow Korsh Theatre by artist Vladimir Sashin.

Development
Film in Russia became a staple of fairs or rented auditoriums.  After the Lumières came representatives from Pathé and Gaumont to open offices, after the turn of the century, to make motion pictures on location for Russian audiences.  Theatres were already built, and film renting distributors had already replaced direct sales to exhibitors, when, in 1908, Alexander Drankov produced the first Russian narrative film, Stenka Razin, based on events told in a popular folk song and directed by Vladimir Romashkov.  At the same time as Drankov was making his film, the Moscow cinema entrepreneur Alexander Khanzhonkov began to operate.

In 1907, the journal Kino was first published. Kino was the first Russian periodical devoted to the cinema.

Ladislas Starevich made the first Russian animated film (and the first stop motion puppet film with a story) in 1910 - Lucanus Cervus.  He continued making animated films (some of which can now be bought on DVD) until his emigration to France following the 1917 October Revolution.  He was decorated by the Tsar for his work in 1911.

Competition from French, American, German, Danish, British and Italian companies, distributing their country's wares to the eager Russians, developed, but the indigenous industry made such strides over the next five years that 129 fully Russian films - even if many of them were comparatively short - were produced in 1918 alone.  In 1912, the Khanzhonkov film studio was operational, and Ivan Mozzhukhin had made his first film there, a feature film of 2000 meters entitled "Oborona Sevastopolya" ("The Defense of Sevastopol").  The same year, a German concern filming in Russia introduced the director Yakov Protazanov to the world with its "Ukhod Velikovo Startsa" ("Departure of the Grand Old Man"), a biographical film about Lev Tolstoy.  Tsar Nicholas himself made some home movies and appointed an official Court Cinematographer, although he is purported to have written in 1913 that film was "an empty matter...even something harmful...silliness...we should not attribute any significance to such trifles".

Tsar Nicholas gave some special assistance to the makers of "The Defence of Sevastopol" and a few similar films, but the industry was not nationalized nor governmentally subsidized or otherwise controlled.  There were also only a few rules of censorship on a national level - such as not making the Tsars characters in a dramatized film - but the filmmakers were largely free to produce for the mass audience; local officials might be more stringent in censoring or banning films.  Detective films were popular, and various forms of melodrama.   

The arrival of World War I in Russia in 1914 sparked a change.  Imports dropped drastically, especially insofar as films from Germany and its allies left the market rapidly.  Russian filmmakers early on turned to anti-German, "patriotic" films, often hastily made, even being filmed while the scripts were still being written, filling in the gap:  in 1916, Russia produced 499 films, over three times the number of just three years earlier, and more of feature length.  Russia's allies, in turn, began to import some of the more striking product, including further films by Protazanov and Yevgeni Bauer, a specialist in psychological film, who both impacted, among others, the burgeoning American film industry.  Adversely, Russian companies were forbidden to send cameramen to the "front", and war footage had to be imported from France and England:  some Russian concerns combined footage from these with enacted war material to create faux documentaries.  Also, the Skobolev Committee was established by the government to oversee the making of newsreel and propaganda films.

And then came the Russian Revolution, on top of the ongoing international War. With audiences turning against the Tsar, film producers began turning out, after the February Revolution, a number of films with anti-Tsarist themes.  These, along with the usual retinue of detective films and melodramas, filled theaters when the streets were not filled with revolutionaries.  However, the destruction of the infrastructure in the major cities, the failing war-drained economy, the takeover of rural cinemas by local Soviets, and the aversion of some in the film industry to communism, caused the Russian film industry per se to effectively die out by the time Lenin on November 8, 1917 proclaimed a new country, the Russian Soviet Federative Socialist Republic.

Ironically, the last significant Russian film completed, in 1917, Father Sergius would become the first new film release a year later, in the new country of the Soviets.

See also
 Cinema of the Soviet Union
 Cinema of Russia

Readings
Yana Hashamova, Pride and Panic: Russian Imagination of the West in Post-Soviet Film (Intellect Books, 2007)

External links
Russian Empire and the Royal Family // Net-Film Newsreels and Documentary Films Archive
Early Russian Cinema, 1907-1918 (PDF)

Russian Nights Film Festival

 
Art of the Russian Empire